The Geelong West Sporting Club was an Australian rules football club that last competed in the Geelong & District Football League from 1986 to the end of the 2016 season. They were based in the Geelong suburb of Geelong West. At the end of 2016, the club merged with the Geelong West St Peters Football Club to form the Geelong West Giants, which will field separate teams in the GFL and the GDFL from the 2017 season.

History
Formed as the Geelong West Cricket & Football Club in 1926, while known as the Cheetahs early on the locals call them Blue West, to distinguish them from the VFA club Red West. After the war, they joined the GDFL in 1946.
The Cheetahs competed in the GDFL Evelyn Hurst competition from 1958 to 1978. It was part of the breakaway movement that created the Geelong Football League in 1979. Falling standards on the field lead the club to be demoted to the Geelong DFL in 1986.

The club's traditional home venue was Bakers Oval in Shannon Avenue, Geelong West. In 2008, the club moved to play its fixtures at West Oval in Church Street, but its administrative and social base remained at Bakers Oval.

Premierships 
1935, 1956, 1966, 1971, 1978, 1987.

VFL/AFL players
 Warren Canning - 
 Barry Eddy - 
 Graham Hunter - 
 Marty Lynch -  , 
 Bill Tomlinson -

References

External links
Official Geelong and District Football League Website

Book
 Cat Country - History of Football In The Geelong Region - John Stoward - 

Geelong Football League clubs
Australian rules football clubs established in 1926
1926 establishments in Australia
Geelong & District Football League clubs
Australian rules football clubs disestablished in 2016
2016 establishments in Australia